James Boyd Utt (March 11, 1899 – March 1, 1970) was a conservative Republican U.S. representative from Orange County, California, from 1953 until his death from a heart attack in 1970.

Biography
Utt was born in Tustin in Orange County. He attended public schools and Santa Ana Junior College. He worked in citrus processing, served in the California State Assembly from 1933 to 1937, and was an inheritance tax appraiser in the state controller's office during 1936 to 1952. In 1946, at the age of forty-seven, Utt graduated from the University of Southern California Law School, was admitted to the bar the next year, and practiced law in Santa Ana.

In 1952, Utt was first elected to the 83rd Congress. He polled 106,972 votes  (63%) against the Democrat Lionel Van Deerlin, who drew 62,779 votes (37%). Utt had no serious challengers in what became an increasingly "safe" seat for him. For instance, in the heavily Democratic year of 1958, he polled 152,855 votes (58%) to Democrat T. R. Boyett's 109,794 votes (42%).

In 1962, when Richard M. Nixon lost the governorship to incumbent Democrat Edmund G. "Pat" Brown, Sr., Utt won reelection with 133,737 (68.5%) to Democrat Burton Shamsky's 61,393 (31.5%). In the wake of Barry Goldwater's landslide defeat in 1964, Utt still polled 65 percent in his district. In 1966, when Ronald W. Reagan blocked a third term for "Pat" Brown, Utt received 73.1 percent in his district (his strongest showing ever). In 1968, when Nixon was elected president, Utt drew a similar vote of 72.5%. That turned out to be his last election, for he died in office before completing the 1969–1971 term.

Utt was an outspoken conservative; one of his unachieved goals was to remove the United States from the United Nations.

Utt voted against the Civil Rights Acts of 1960, 1964, and 1968, and the Voting Rights Act of 1965, but did not vote on the Civil Rights Act of 1957 and abstained from voting on the 24th Amendment to the U.S. Constitution.

In 1963, he claimed that "a large contingent of barefooted Africans" might be training in Georgia as part of a United Nations military exercise to take over the United States. In 1963, he also claimed that African Americans might be training in Cuba to invade the United States.

In 1964, he had been a strong supporter of fellow Republican Barry Goldwater for the presidency. Goldwater had also voted against the 1964 civil rights law on constitutional and libertarian grounds but later repudiated his position.

In 1966, journalist Drew Pearson reported that Utt was one of a group of congressmen who had received the "Statesman of the Republic" award from Liberty Lobby for his "right-wing activities".

He died at Bethesda Naval Hospital of a heart attack, which developed while he was attending church just 10 days shy of his 71st birthday. Utt is interred at Santa Ana Cemetery in Santa Ana.

Utt was succeeded in the 35th Congressional District by fellow conservative Republican John G. Schmitz. Schmitz won the seat for a full term in the 1970 general election, aided in part by the presence of Governor Reagan, who was about to win a second term. Schmitz polled 192,765 votes (67 percent) to Democrat Thomas B. Lenhart's 87,019 (30.7 percent). The turnout in the district continued to grow along with the Orange County population. (Schmitz later abandoned the GOP, on his belief that the party had grown "too liberal." He was the American Independent Party presidential nominee in 1972 but won no states in his opposition to Richard Nixon's second term.)

See also
 List of United States Congress members who died in office (1950–99)

References

Further reading
 Memorial services held in the House of Representatives and Senate of the United States, together with tributes presented in eulogy of James B. Utt, late a Representative from California. (Washington: Government Printing Office, 1970)
 Congressional Quarterly's Guide to U.S. Elections

External links

Join California James B. Utt

1899 births
1970 deaths
20th-century far-right politicians in the United States
People from Tustin, California
California lawyers
USC Gould School of Law alumni
Republican Party members of the United States House of Representatives from California
Old Right (United States)
20th-century American politicians
20th-century American lawyers
Republican Party members of the California State Assembly